Vernoniastrum is a genus of flowering plants belonging to the family Asteraceae.

Its native range is Tropical and Southern Africa, Madagascar.

Species:
 Vernoniastrum acuminatissimum (S.Moore) H.Rob., Skvarla & V.A.Funk 
 Vernoniastrum aemulans (Vatke) H.Rob.

References

Asteraceae
Asteraceae genera